Xinyuictis ("weasel from Xinyu") is an extinct genus of placental mammals from clade Carnivoraformes, that lived in Asia from early to late Eocene.

Phylogeny
The phylogenetic relationships of genus Xinyuictis are shown in the following cladogram:

See also
 Mammal classification
 Carnivoraformes
 Miacidae

References

Prehistoric mammals of Asia
Miacids
Fossil taxa described in 1975
Prehistoric placental genera
†